Taken in Broad Daylight is a 2009 American television film directed by Gary Yates and starring Sara Canning, James Van Der Beek, and LeVar Burton. It is based on the real-life kidnapping of Nebraska teenager Anne Sluti, who was abducted and held for six days in April 2001 by Anthony Steven Wright, also known as Tony Zappa. Wright was later sentenced to life for the Sluti abduction.

Plot

On April 6, 2001, Anne Sluti (Sara Canning), an all-American 17-year-old from Kearney, Nebraska, is seen running on a track at her high school as her boyfriend, Gary, and her best friend, Paige, watch.  Gary gives Anne a teddy bear for their anniversary. Anne then departs with her best friend, and as she arrives home, finds her brother, whom she has not seen for a while. After having dinner with her family, they show Anne the letter in which she has been accepted to a college. She stops at a store and goes to her car, but when she is about to get into her car, Tony Zappa (James Van Der Beek) comes up behind her and drags her to his car. Anne begins screaming as onlookers call 911; Anne escapes from the car but Tony punches her, throws Anne in the car, and drives off.

The police arrive. When one of the detectives tells Officer Mike Timbrook (LeVar Burton) that the car belongs to Anne Sluti, Officer Timbrook goes off to tell the Sluti family.

At night, Anne awakens, and Tony tells her that she should not have screamed. Anne says that she screamed because he was punching her, and soon realizes that Tony will not release her. Tony pulls the car over, and after binding her hands behind her back and blindfolding her, he tells her that if she can get out of the binding, she can leave. She cannot, and Tony returns her to the car.

After driving for some time, he removes the blindfold. The car suddenly crashes and flips on its side. Tony frees himself, but Anne, strapped in a seat belt with her hands still bound, is unable to do the same. Tony climbs back and cuts the seat belt, pulls her out of the car, and onto the grass. While she gasps for air, Tony says, "I saved your life. That means I own you."

Daylight breaks and Tony has a chain around Anne's neck as they walk down a dirt road. Tony sees a tractor and ties the end of the chain to a post while he drags the car out of the ditch with the tractor. Anne uses this opportunity to leave a message by carving her initials, A.S. into a rock. Anne persuades Tony to let her call someone and tell them that it was her idea to take off.

Back at the Sluti home, one of Anne's mother's friends, Cat, lets Anne's parents stay at her home to rest while she stays at their house in case anything new happens. Later, the phone rings, and it's Anne. Tony has her call home. Anne asks for her mother Elaine, pretending that Elaine is just a friend, but Tony hangs up and has her call Paige. Anne leaves a clue in her message. Tony believes she says she's on "a quality vacation," while she is actually saying "equality vacation," signifying that she is in Wyoming (whose motto is "equality"). Then she hangs up, and Tony says that it's time they start their "vacation."

Tony and Anne stop at a cabin that he breaks into. He cooks them dinner made from a rabbit he killed; this is when Anne learns his name and that he is going to keep her. In a delusion, he states he imagines Anne in a yellow dress, thanking him for a nice dinner. He then takes the chain lock that was previously on Anne's neck, attaching it to her leg and a couch. He then gives her a wedding ring to wear. He excuses himself to "take a piss," while in reality he is injecting himself with drugs and begins yelling upstairs. Anne then spots a phone outlet, which she drags closer to herself by using an umbrella. She dials 9-1-1 and tells the operator that she's been kidnapped by a man named Tony. The call is being traced; Officer Timbrook received word about the call. He and FBI Agent Reynolds (Alexandra Castillo), who have taken over the case due to Anne being taken across state lines, learn that Tony Zappa is the abductor and that he is wanted on other charges for causing a manhunt after closing down the Mall of America in search of him the month before. As the FBI search the cabin, they discover that Anne and Tony have fled. Officer Timbrook and Agent Reynolds go to visit Tony's grandmother for questioning; she is a religious woman who says that Tony is a good boy. Anne's mother is at home praying.

Tony, angered at Anne for alerting the police, has her starting to dig her own grave. She argues that he's going to kill her anyway and refuses to dig anymore, pleading with Tony either to let her go or shoot her. He holds a knife up to her and lets her know that he is not going to kill her. He then pushes her to the ground; she realizes what he's going to do to her and begs him to stop, but he puts the knife up to her neck, he then cuts her shirt open and rapes her.

The next morning, Tony takes her to a campsite, where he tells Anne to wash herself to destroy evidence, whilst he searches a camp truck and house for new clothes for her. Anne pulls from her jacket the teddy bear that Gary gave her. Anne washes her face and arms vigorously while Tony watches from afar. He then goes outside and gives Anne sweatpants, a sweatshirt, and slippers to change into inside the house. After she changes, Tony tells her that she looks nice.

When Tony goes outside, Anne turns on the television and sees a news report on her and Tony, then an interview with her parents and brother. She begins to cry as Tony rushes inside. She quickly turns off the television, but he knows that it had been on. He asks her what it was, and she denies that she had been doing anything. Tony is amused when the reporter gives a description of him, calling him the "jack rabbit," but he gets enraged when a description of the car is listed; he knocks the television off of its shelf as it breaks. Tony storms out of the house as Anne follows. He turns around as she says they need to find a new car. Tony tells her to come so they can go.

Anne asks why he took her. He responds saying "I get tired of being alone". Tony steals a station wagon and makes Anne get all of the stuff out of the other car. She leaves her teddy bear behind as another clue.

Officer Timbrook and Agent Reynolds find the car not too long after. Officer Timbrook finds the teddy bear and removes its head, finding a note that says "Sluti Wed 1 PM." He shows Officer Reynolds the note, telling her that they missed the two by an hour.

Tony discovers another deserted house. As he breaks the bolt off the door, an older man walking his dog spots the station wagon and looks right at the house. While Anne and Tony are inside, he starts yelling because he has run out of the supply of drugs he usually injects into himself. Tony drags her close to the window and asks her what she sees; she says she can't see anything because it's too dark, as it is nighttime. He calls her a liar. Lights flash outside as it becomes evident that the FBI and police have found them.

Tony becomes hysterical, blaming Anne and saying he is not going to go to prison. Anne tells him to call the police, as she won't let them hurt him. She gets on the phone and asks them to let Tony call his grandmother. When he talks to his grandmother, she asks if it's true that he took Anne, and said she'll be praying for him. Tony tells his grandmother that he's going to kill Anne, and then himself. He points the gun at Anne's chest as Anne picks up the phone and tells the police not to shoot, as they are coming out. She tells Tony they can't shoot, or they'd end up shooting her, too. As they exit the house, he has his arm wrapped around her; she turns around and tells him to put the gun down. As he does, Anne runs to Officer Timbrook. Tony begins screaming for Anne as the FBI and police rush towards him. He begs them not to shoot, as he is getting on the ground. While Officer Timbrook is hugging Anne, he shows her the teddy bear that she left behind, returning it to Anne. Tony is put in the back of a police car, still screaming her name. Anne and Officer Timbrook walk up to the window as Anne throws at the window the wedding ring Tony gave to her, much to Tony's shock, as he begins to realize that he has forever failed in his goal of keeping Annie to himself, and he is now paying the highest price for it. As revealed in the text in the end, Tony ends up being convicted of his crime and sentenced to life in prison without parole.

The film ends with Anne in a car as Officer Timbrook drives her home. She gets out of the car, running towards her family and hugging them as reporters all around are filming and asking questions. Officer Timbrook smiles while Anne's father looks up at him, mouthing, "Thank you."

Cast
Sara Canning as Anne Sluti
James Van Der Beek as Anthony Steven "Tony Zappa" Wright
LeVar Burton as Mike Timbrook
Diana Reis as Elaine Sluti
Tom Anniko as Don Sluti
Brian Edward Roach as Tom Sluti
Alexandra Castillo as Agent Reynolds
Sarah Constible as Cat
Jacqueline Loewen as Paige
Garth Merkeley as Gary
Adriana O'Neil as Diane
Nancy Drake as Tony's Grandma
Robert Huculak as Agent Carter
Kristen Harris as Katie Harris

References

External links
 

2009 television films
2009 films
2000s crime films
American crime films
Films about child abduction in the United States
Films set in 2001
Films set in Nebraska
Films set in Wyoming
Lifetime (TV network) films
Crime films based on actual events
Films directed by Gary Yates
2000s English-language films
2000s American films